Maud von Rosen-Engberg (2 August 1902 – 13 December 1988) was a Swedish sculptor. Her work was part of the sculpture event in the art competition at the 1932 Summer Olympics.

References

1902 births
1988 deaths
20th-century Swedish sculptors
Swedish women sculptors
Olympic competitors in art competitions
People from Södermanland